Whitworth is a civil parish in Rossendale, Lancashire, England.  It contains 25 listed buildings that are recorded in the National Heritage List for England.  All of the listed buildings are designated at Grade II, the lowest of the three grades, which is applied to "buildings of national importance and special interest".  The parish contains the town of Whitworth and stretches along a valley.  It is largely residential with some agriculture in the surrounding countryside.  The older listed buildings consist mainly of houses, farmhouses and farm buildings.  Later buildings include churches and associated structures, the viaduct of a disused railway, and three cemetery chapels.

Buildings

Notes and references

Notes

Citations

Sources

Lists of listed buildings in Lancashire
Buildings and structures in the Borough of Rossendale